Liga ASOBAL 2007–08 season was the 18th since its establishment. A total of 16 teams competed this season for the championship.

Competition format
The competition was played in a round-robin format, through 30 rounds. The team with most points earned wins the championship. The last two teams were relegated.

Overall standing

Teka Cantabria was relegated due to financial troubles. Thus, Keymare Almería remained in Liga ASOBAL.

Conclusions
 BM Ciudad Real -- EHF Champions League and Liga ASOBAL Champion
 FC Barcelona Handbol -- EHF Champions League
 CB Ademar León -- EHF Champions League
 Portland San Antonio -- EHF Champions League
 BM Valladolid -- EHF Cup Winner's Cup
 CAI BM Aragón -- EHF Cup
 JD Arrate -- EHF Cup
 Algeciras BM—Relegated to División de Honor B 
 Keymare Almería—Relegated to División de Honor B

Top goal scorers

As day 30 of 30

Top goalkeepers

As day 30 of 30 

Liga ASOBAL seasons
1
Spain